The 1973 Atlantic Coast Conference men's basketball tournament was held in Greensboro, North Carolina, at the Greensboro Coliseum from March 8–10.  defeated Maryland, 76–74, to win the championship. Tommy Burleson of NC State was named the tournament MVP.

Bracket

References

Tournament
ACC men's basketball tournament
Basketball in North Carolina
College sports in North Carolina
Sports competitions in Greensboro, North Carolina
ACC men's basketball tournament
ACC men's basketball tournament